The West Kowloon Law Courts Building is a courthouse in Sham Shui Po, Kowloon, Hong Kong. It sits at the junction of Tung Chau Street and Tonkin Street West, beside the elevated West Kowloon Corridor.

History
The new building was proposed in 2009 to consolidate under one roof the Tsuen Wan Magistrates’ Courts, Small Claims Tribunal, Coroner’s Courts, Obscene Articles Tribunal, and other facilities. It also addresses a shortfall in the number of available courtrooms.

The contract for the design and construction of the courthouse was awarded to Shui On Construction in 2012. The building was completed in 2016.

The Small Claims Tribunal relocated to the new courthouse on 19 September 2016. The Tsuen Wan Magistrates' Courts followed on 28 December 2016, and was renamed the West Kowloon Magistrates' Courts. The Coroner's Court and the Obscene Articles Tribunal moved on 16 January 2017.

Description
This figure does not include service areas like corridors, car parking, lobbies, balconies, etc. It is much larger than a standard Hong Kong courthouse, and as such has been referred to as the "mega court" in local media.

Transport
The new courts building is roughly equidistant to both Nam Cheong station and Cheung Sha Wan station of the Mass Transit Railway (MTR). It is about a 10 minute walk from both stations.

References

External links

Judiciary of Hong Kong
Sham Shui Po